Torvosaurus is a genus of carnivorous megalosaurid theropod dinosaur that lived approximately 165 to 148 million years ago during the late Middle and Late Jurassic period (Callovian to Tithonian stages) in what is now Colorado, Portugal, Germany, and possibly England, Spain, Tanzania, and Uruguay. It contains two currently recognized species, Torvosaurus tanneri and Torvosaurus gurneyi, plus a third species from Germany that is currently unnamed.

T. tanneri was among the largest carnivores of its time, together with Epanterias and Saurophaganax (which could both be synonyms for Allosaurus). Based on bone morphology, Torvosaurus is thought to have had short but very powerful arms.

Discovery 

Fossilized remains of Torvosaurus have been found in North America, Portugal, Germany, and possibly also England, Spain, Tanzania, and Uruguay.

The material consisted of part of the left foot and right hand and they were taken to the Field Museum of Natural History in Chicago, Illinois where they were stored until being re-discovered around 2010. The specimen was assigned to Torvosaurus tanneri after being described in 2014.

It was eventually reclassified as a probable member of the Carcharodontosauridae before being reclassified as a probable member of the Torvosaurus genus in 2020; although only referred to as Torvosaurus sp., one commentator has noted it could potentially be called Torvosaurus ingens. Soto et al. described teeth of a member of the genus Torvosaurus from the Tacuarembó Formation of Uruguay. The authors noted that some of the specimens of "Megalosaurus ingens figured by Werner Janensch share the features of the Uruguayan material, and stated that the materials from Tanzania and Uruguay may represent the same taxon due to geographical proximity, but ultimately concluded that based on teeth only they do not share any derived character to distinguish them from the described species of the genus, T. tanneri and T. gurneyi. However, Rauhut et al. consider the teeth to be undiagnostic, being coherent in size and shape with a variety of other theropods (including carcharodontosaurids), and thus they consider their attribution to the genus to be problematic.

In 1971, Vivian Jones, of Delta, Colorado (USA), in the Calico Gulch Quarry in Moffat County, discovered a single gigantic thumb claw of a theropod. This was shown to James Alvin Jensen, a collector working for Brigham Young University. In an effort to discover comparable fossils, Vivian's husband Daniel Eddie Jones directed Jensen to the Dry Mesa Quarry, where abundant gigantic theropod bones, together with Supersaurus remains, proved present in rocks of the Morrison Formation. From 1972 onward the site was excavated by Jensen and Kenneth Stadtman. The type species Torvosaurus tanneri was named and described in 1979 by Peter Malcolm Galton and Jensen. The genus name Torvosaurus derives from the Latin word torvus, meaning "savage", and the Greek word sauros (σαυρος), meaning "lizard". The specific name tanneri, is named after first counselor in the First Presidency of the Church of Jesus Christ of Latter-day Saints Nathan Eldon Tanner.
 
In 1985, Jensen could report a considerable amount of additional material, among it the first skull elements. The fossils from Colorado were further described by Brooks Britt in 1991.
The holotype BYU 2002 originally consisted of upper arm bones (humeri) and lower arm bones (radii and ulnae). The paratypes included some back bones, hip bones, and hand bones. When the material described in 1985 is added, the main missing elements are the shoulder girdle and the thighbone. The holotype and paratypes represented at least three individuals: two adults and a juvenile. In 1991, Britt concluded that there was no proof that the front limbs of the holotype were associated and chose the left humerus as the lectotype. Several single bones and teeth found in other American sites have been referred to Torvosaurus.

In 1992, fossils of a large theropod found at Como Bluff in Wyoming, containing skull, shoulder girdle, pelvis and rib elements, were named by Robert T. Bakker et al. as the species Edmarka rex. Bakker et al were impressed with the size of Edmarka, noting that it "would rival T. rex in total length," and viewing this approximate size as "a natural ceiling for dinosaurian meat-eaters." This was often considered a junior synonym of Torvosaurus, but a detailed analysis has not been carried out yet. The same site has rendered comparable remains for which the nomen nudum Brontoraptor has been used. Most researchers now regard both specimens as belonging to Torvosaurus tanneri. However, both the Edmarka rex and Brontoraptor require reclassification to determine whether they actually belong to T. tanneri, for all the specimens described prior to their discovery indicate that they reached their adult size, and both incomplete specimens lack detailed osteological descriptions.

In 2012, a still undescribed, 55% complete specimen was discovered in Colorado in the Skull Creek Quarry, an exposure of the Morrison Formation. The specimen, nicknamed "Elvis", included the pelvic, spine, and hind limb bones, a complete, associated backbone, maxillary and cranial elements, and is the most complete specimen of Torvosaurus found to date. A mounted skeleton of the specimen, with missing parts reconstructed with casts from other Torvosaurus specimens is currently on display in the Museum of Natural History & Science in Cincinnati.

In 2000, material from Portugal was referred to a Torvosaurus sp. by Octávio Mateus and Miguel Telles Antunes. In 2006 fossils from the Portuguese Lourinhã Formation were referred to Torvosaurus tanneri. In 2012, however, Matthew Carrano et al. concluded that this material could not be more precisely determined than a Torvosaurus sp. In 2013 and 2014 eggs with and without embryos were reported from Portugal, referred to Torvosaurus. The species from Portugal was named T. gurneyi in honor of James Gurney in 2014, the creator of the Dinotopia series of books. It is the largest named theropod known from Europe, although an isolated anterior caudal vertebra from the Vega Formation in Spain, which may belong to Torvosaurus or a closely related taxon, is about 15% larger than the one found on T. gurneyi. Furthermore, remains of a large spinosaurid from the Vectis Formation in the Isle of Wight include vertebrae of size comparable to those of Spinosaurus, indicating an animal exceeding 10 m in length, making it the largest reported European theropod.

It was the morphological distinctiveness of the holotype maxilla ML1100 that led to the naming of the Portuguese species.

In 2017, a set of Portuguese cranial material assigned to Torvosaurus was described, including a specimen interpreted as belonging to the same individual as the holotype of Torvosaurus gurneyi.

In 2020, Soto et al. described FC-DPV 2971, a tooth from Uruguay, as belonging to a new unnamed species of Torvosaurus. They also assigned Megalosaurus/Ceratosaurus ingens (specimen MB R 1050) from Tanzania to Torvosaurus.

Also in 2020, a fragmentary maxilla referable to Torvosaurus was described from the middle Callovian Ornatenton Formation of Germany. This is the oldest record of the genus and suggests that megalosaurines originated in Europe, or at least that Europe was a biogeographical turntable for this group from the Middle to the early Late Jurassic. Other possible Torvosaurus instances in Europe include fragmentary remains from the Kimmeridge Clay of England which possibly belong to the genus. These consist of a tibia (OUMNH J.29886) and a maxilla fragment, collected separately from each other.

Description 

Furthermore, both the Edmarka rex and Brontoraptor lack detailed analysis to verify whether they actually belong to T. tanneri.

Among the differentiating features originally recognized between T. gurneyi and T. tanneri are the number of teeth and the size and shape of the mouth. While the upper jaw of T. tanneri has more than 11 teeth, that of T. gurneyi has less. However, later examination of a new right maxilla probably belonging to the same individual as the holotype of T. gurneyi has determined that while the two species can be distinguished based on the morphology of the maxillary medial wall and interdental plates, the supposedly lower number of maxillary teeth in the Portuguese form may be an artifact of preservation since it is not possible to know at the moment the exact number of teeth in the complete maxilla.

The material from Germany is further distinguished by the other two species by a temporal difference of c. 10 Ma and a few morphological differences which indicate that the animal was the third species outside a sister taxon relationship between T. tanneri and T. gurneyi. The material is only 10% smaller than the maxilla of T. tanneri, although the ontogenetic stage of the specimen is unknown, indicating that derived megalosaurines were already among the largest terrestrial predators in the late Middle Jurassic, with only a moderate increase in size in the genus in the Late Jurassic.

Torvosaurus had an elongated, narrow snout, with a kink in its profile just above the large nostrils. The frontmost snout bone, the premaxilla, bore three rather flat teeth oriented somewhat outwards with the front edge of the teeth crown overlapping the outer side of the rear edge of the preceding crown. The maxilla was tall and bore at least eleven rather long teeth. The antorbital fenestra was relatively short. The lacrimal bone had a distinctive lacrimal horn on top; its lower end was broad in side view. The eye socket was tall with a pointed lower end. The jugal was long and transversely thin. The lower front side of the quadrate bone was hollowed out by a tear-shaped depression, the contact surface with the quadratojugal. Both the neck vertebrae and the front dorsal vertebrae had relatively flexible ball-in-socket joints. The balls, on the front side of the vertebral centra, had a wide rim, a condition by Britt likened to a Derby hat. The tail base was stiffened in the vertical plane by high and in side view wide neural spines. The upper arm was robust; the lower arm robust but short. Whether the thumb claw was especially enlarged, is uncertain. In the pelvis, the ilium resembled that of Megalosaurus and had a tall, short, front blade and a longer pointed rear blade. The pelvis as a whole was massively built, with the bone skirts between the pubic bones and the ischia contacting each other and forming a vaulted closed underside.

Systematics and classification 

When first described in 1979 by Galton and Jensen, Torvosaurus was classified as a megalosaurid, which is the current consensus. It was later assigned to Carnosauria by Ralph Molnar et al. in 1990, and to a basal position in Spinosauroidea by Oliver Walter Mischa Rauhut in 2003, and to a very basal position in the Tetanurae by Thomas Holtz in 1994; all these assignments are not supported by present phylogenetic analysis. In 1985, Jensen assigned Torvosaurus a family of its own, the Torvosauridae. Despite support for this concept by Paul Sereno and Mateus, it seems redundant as Torvosaurus is closely related to, and perhaps the sister species of, the earlier Megalosaurus within a Megalosaurinae. However, Torvosauridae may be used as an alternative name for Megalosauridae if Megalosaurus is considered an indeterminable nomen dubium. Though a close relative of Megalosaurus, Torvosaurus is seemingly more advanced or apomorphic. Torvosauruss larger clade, the Megalosauridae, is most commonly held as a basal branch of the Tetanurae, and considered less derived than carnosaurs or coelurosaurs, and likely related to the spinosaurids.
 
The following is a cladogram based on the phylogenetic analysis conducted by Carrano, Benson & Sampson (2012), showing the relationships of Torvosaurus:

Distinguishing anatomical features 

According to Carrano et al. (2012), Torvosaurus can be distinguished based on the following characteristics:
 the presence of a very shallow maxillary fossa (it lacks a fenestra maxillaris piercing the bone wall)
 the presence of fused interdental plates
 the pneumatic fossae in the posterior dorsal and the anterior caudal vertebrae centra are expanded, forming enlarged, deep openings
 the puboischiadic plate is highly ossified (the paired bony plates, of both sides, connect and close off the entire underside of the pelvis, a very basal trait that Galton & Jensen saw as an indication that Theropoda was polyphyletic, the Carnosauria having independently evolved from carnivorous Prosauropoda)
 a distal expansion of the ischium shaft with a prominent lateral midline crest and an oval outline when examined in lateral view
 the cervical vertebrae are opisthocoelous with a pronounced flat rim around the anterior, ball (according to Rauhut, 2000)
 a (transverse) fenestra is situated in the neural arch of the dorsal vertebrae in front of the hyposphene (according to Rauhut, 2000)

Paleobiology 

The study of fossil dinosaur embryos provides researchers with information about the transformation of the embryo over time, the different developmental pathways present in dinosaur lineages, dinosaur reproductive behavior, and dinosaur parental care.

In 2013, Araújo et al. announced the discovery of specimen ML1188, a clutch of crushed dinosaur eggs and embryonic material attributed to Torvosaurus. This discovery further supports the hypothesis that large theropod dinosaurs were oviparous, meaning that they laid eggs and hence that embryonic development occurred outside the body of female dinosaurs. This discovery was made in 2005 by the Dutch amateur fossil-hunter Aart Walen at the Lourinhã Formation in Western Portugal, in fluvial overbank sediments that are considered to be from the Tithonian stage of the Jurassic Period, approximately 152 to 145 million years ago. This discovery is significant paleontologically for a number of reasons: (a) these are the most primitive dinosaur embryos known; (b) these are the only basal theropod embryos known; (c) fossilized eggs and embryos are rarely found together; (d) it represents the first evidence of a one-layered eggshell for theropod dinosaurs; and (e) it allows researchers to link a new eggshell morphology to the osteology of a particular group of theropod dinosaurs. The specimen is housed at the Museu da Lourinhã, in Portugal. As the eggs were abandoned due to unknown circumstances, it is not known if Torvosaurus provided parental care to its eggs and young or abandoned them shortly after laying. However, the eggshells are highly porous, allowing efficient gaseous exchange between the external and internal media, and thus indicative of eggs buried for incubation within the substrate, in a manner similar to modern seaturtles. This is also corroborated by the undisturbed taphonomic setting and low-energy geological context.

All documented Torvosaurus specimens from the Morrison Formation are from similarly sized, likely adult individuals, and the lack of immature individuals may be explained by many factors, none of which are mutually exclusive. For one thing, the formation is known to preserve large vertebrates better than smaller ones. Immature individuals may also have occupied a different ecological niche from adults in habitats where their remains were likely to preserve as fossils, and they may have been the prey of choice of larger predators as well. Torvosaurus may also have experienced Type B1 population survivorship as has been found in other dinosaurs, with mortality increasing after sexual maturity was achieved leading to an abundance of mature individuals in the fossil record. A final possibility is that immature Torvosaurus remains could be misidentified due to having different proportions compared to the very large and robust adults.

Paleoecology

Provenance and occurrence 
The type specimen of Torvosaurus tanneri BYU 2002 was recovered in the Dry Mesa Quarry of the Brushy Basin Member of the Morrison Formation, in Montrose County, Colorado. The specimen was collected by James A. Jensen and Kenneth Stadtman in 1972 in medium-grained, coarse sandstone that was deposited during the Tithonian and Kimmeridgian stages of the Jurassic period, approximately 153 to 148 million years ago. This specimen is housed in the collection of Brigham Young University in Provo, Utah.

Fauna and habitat in North America 
Studies suggest that the paleoenvironment of this section of the Morrison Formation included rivers that flowed from the west into a basin that contained a giant, saline alkaline lake and there were extensive wetlands in the vicinity. The Dry Mesa Dinosaur Quarry of western Colorado yields one of the most diverse Upper Jurassic vertebrate assemblages in the world. The Dry Mesa Quarry has produced the remains of the sauropods Apatosaurus, Brachiosaurus, Diplodocus, Barosaurus, Supersaurus, Dystylosaurus, and Camarasaurus, the iguanodonts Camptosaurus and Dryosaurus, and the theropods Allosaurus, Tanycolagreus, Koparion, Stokesosaurus, Ceratosaurus, and Ornitholestes, as well as Othnielosaurus, Gargoyleosaurus, and Stegosaurus.

The flora of the period has been revealed by fossils of green algae, fungi, mosses, horsetails, ferns, cycads, ginkgoes, and several families of conifers. Animal fossils discovered include bivalves, snails, ray-finned fishes, frogs, salamanders, amphibians, turtles, sphenodonts, lizards, terrestrial (like Hoplosuchus) and aquatic crocodylomorphs, cotylosaurs, several species of pterosaurs like Harpactognathus, and early mammals, multituberculates, symmetrodonts, and triconodonts.

Fauna and habitat in Europe 
 
The Ornatenton Formation is a Callovian aged shallow marine deposit, within the formation Torvosaurus was sympatric with the closely related and also large Wiehenvenator.

The Lourinhã Formation is Kimmeridgian-Tithonian in age. The environment is coastal, and therefore has a strong marine influence. Its flora and fauna are very similar to the Morrison. Torvosaurus appears to be the top predator here. It lived alongside European species of Allosaurus (A. europaeus), Ceratosaurus, Stegosaurus, and presumably Camptosaurus. The theropod Lourinhanosaurus also stalked the area. Lusotitan was the largest sauropod in the region, while the diplodocids Dinheirosaurus and Lourinhasaurus were also present. Dacentrurus and Miragaia were both stegosaurs, while Dracopelta was an ankylosaurian. Draconyx was an iguanodontid related to Camptosaurus. Due to the marine nature of the Lourinhã Formation, sharks, plesiochelyid turtles, and teleosaurid crocodyliforms are also present.

Fauna and habitat in Africa
The small-scale trough and ripple cross-bedded fine-grained sandstone at the base of the Upper Dinosaur Member of the Tendaguru Formation, of which possible Torvosaurus material is known from, is interpreted as tidal flat deposits. Still water bodies such as small lakes and ponds were present and a freshwater depositional environment close to the sea was also probably present.

The possible unnamed Torvosaurus species from the Tendaguru Formation would have shared its habitat with many species of sauropods, such as Australodocus, Dicraeosaurus, Giraffatitan, Janenschia, Tornieria, Wamweracaudia, three unnamed species of diplodocine sauropods, an unnamed species of flagellicaudatan, and "The Archbishop". The theropods it coexisted with were Allosaurus tendagurensis, Ceratosaurus roechlingi, Elaphrosaurus, Labrosaurus stechowi, Ostafrikasaurus, Veterupristisaurus (of which it would have possibly competed with to be top predator), a possible abelisauroid, and an indeterminate megalosauroid, while the ornithischians it coexisted with were Dysalotosaurus and Kentrosaurus. As far as pterosaurs are concerned, it coexisted with Tendaguripterus, an indeterminate archaeopterodactyloid, an indeterminate azhdarchid, two indeterminate dsungaripteroids, an indeterminate rhamphorynchoid, and an indeterminate pterosaur of unknown classification. Due to the coastal environment of the Tendaguru Formation, crocodyliformes such as Bernissartia, amphibians including an unnamed lissamphibian and sharks are also present.

Fauna and habitat in South America
Within South America, possible Torvosaurus remains are only present within the Tacuarembó Formation of Uruguay. Because the formation was laid down in fluvial to lacustrine sandstones, siltstones, and mudstones, this indicates that the environment of the formation would have been dominated by rivers, streams, and lakes.

If present, Torvosaurus would probably have been the apex predator in the Tacuarembó Formation, although it may have been rivalled by cf. Ceratosaurus. It shared its habitat with two unnamed theropods, an unnamed coelurosaur, an unnamed sauropod known solely from footprints, an unnamed ornithopod also known from footprints, an indeterminate mesoeucrocodylian, an indeterminate turtle species which lived alongside the named turtle species Tacuarembemys kusterae, and the possible pholidosaur Meridiosaurus vallisparadisi. Fish such as Arganodus tiguidiensis, Asiatoceratodus cf. tiguidensis, Neoceratodus africanus, and Priohybodus arambourgi, and bivalves such as Diplodon are also present.

Coexistence with other large carnivores 
Torvosaurus coexisted with other large theropods such as Allosaurus, Ceratosaurus, and Saurophaganax in the United States, Allosaurus, Ceratosaurus, and Lourinhanosaurus in Portugal, possibly Veterupristisaurus in Tanzania and possibly cf. Ceratosaurus (?) in Uruguay. The three, possibly four, species appear to have had different ecological niches, based on anatomy and the location of fossils. Torvosaurus and Ceratosaurus may have preferred to be active around waterways, and had lower, more sinuous, bodies that would have given them an advantage in forest and underbrush terrains, whereas Allosaurus had shorter bodies, longer legs, were faster but less maneuverable, and seem to have preferred dry floodplains. Also, Rauhut et al. (2016) proposed that allosaurids and megalosaurids would have had different environmental preferences, the former being more common in inland areas while the latter being dominant in marine and coastal environments.

On the other hand, the majority of Torvosaurus remains from the Morrison Formation have been found in localities preserving multiple taxa, including Allosaurus, with Torvosaurus itself being a minor component of the bonebeds. This pattern has been interpreted as indicative of Torvosaurus sharing habitats with other predators, most notably Allosaurus, but at much lower abundances. The three may also have had different dietary preferences, with Allosaurus being more suited for bone slicing thanks to its short and stout serrated teeth, deep but narrow skull and powerful dorsoventral movement capacity of the neck, while Ceratosaurus, with its long and blade-like teeth and relatively straight neck would have probably been incapable of doing so, instead concentrating on the deepest organs of a carcass. While probably capable of some bone consumption, Torvosaurus, with its big skull and teeth and large powerful and lithe body may have been specialized in opening up and dismembering exceptionally large sauropod carcasses - which would have allowed smaller theropods like Allosaurus better access, in a possible commensalism relationship.

Allosaurus was itself a potential food item to other carnivores, as illustrated by an Allosaurus pubic foot marked by the teeth of another theropod, probably Ceratosaurus or Torvosaurus. The location of the bone in the body (along the bottom margin of the torso and partially shielded by the legs), and the fact that it was among the most massive in the skeleton, indicates that the Allosaurus was being scavenged.

Bite marks on Allosaurus and Mymoorapelta remains were found among other bones with feeding traces in the Upper Jurassic Mygatt-Moore Quarry. Unlike the others, these have left striations that, when measured to determine denticle width, produced tooth and body size extrapolations greater than any known specimen of Allosaurus or Ceratosaurus, the two large predators known for osteological remains from the quarry. The extrapolations are instead coherent either with an unusually large specimen of Allosaurus, or a separate large taxon like Torvosaurus or Saurophaganax, both of which are not known from the quarry. The result either increases the known diversity of the site based on ichnological evidence alone, or represents powerful evidence of cannibalism in Allosaurus. Based on the position and nutrient value associated with the various skeletal elements with bite marks, it is predicted that while Mymoorapelta was either predated upon or scavenged shortly after death, Allosaurus was scavenged some time after death.

References

External links 
 Largest Predatory Dinosaur in Europe Found at nationalgeographic

Megalosaurs
Kimmeridgian life
Tithonian life
Late Jurassic dinosaurs of North America
Jurassic United States
Fossils of the United States
Paleontology in Colorado
Dinosaurs of the Morrison Formation
Late Jurassic dinosaurs of Europe
Jurassic Portugal
Fossils of Portugal
Lourinhã Formation
Fossil taxa described in 1979
Taxa named by Peter Galton
Taxa named by James A. Jensen